The Kingsville Kings are a junior ice hockey team based in Kingsville, Ontario, Canada. They are members of the South Division of the Greater Metro Junior A Hockey League (GMHL). The Kings were founded in 2015 and joined the GMHL to compete in the 2015–16 season. The club plays their home games at Kingsville Arena Complex.

History

The Kingsville Kings was announced to the public in summer 2015 with local Tom Schinkelshoek named the team president. The Kings started their first season with a lengthy undefeated streak.  Their first game took place in Brantford, Ontario, on September 8, 2015, against the Brantford Steelfighters, winning 11–0.  Jan Pechek and Léon Marty split the first win and shutout in team history, while Alexander Naskov scored the first goal in team history with 7:57 left in the first period.  The Kings' first home game was on September 11 against the Toronto Blue Ice Jets, winning 4–3.  Pechek picked up the team's first home victory in net with 27 saves.  Kingsville's streak was snapped after 22 wins by the Komoka Dragons. The Kings finished first in the GMHL's South Division and second place overall with 39 wins, 2 losses, and a forfeit due to weather.  Jan Pechek led the GMHL with wins (24) and saves percentage (0.951), while Wes Werner set a league record with a goals against average of 1.20.  As a core, the Kings set a league record for lowest recorded goals allowed with 71.

The Kings gained international attention due to a video recorded during a road game against the London Lakers on November 20, 2015.  A brawl broke out when a London player struck Kingsville's goalie Jan Pechek.  During the fight, a linesman struck a London player and then was attacked by a member of the London Lakers' bench staff.

The Kings finished their inaugural season with the South Division's regular season and playoff championships, but eventually lost the GMHL Russell Cup final in seven games to the Tottenham Steam.

Season-by-season results

League awards
2015–16 Top Forward - Ludwig Niederbach
2015–16 Top Goaltender - Jan Pechek
2016–17 Top Defensive Forward - Blake Naida
2018–19 Top Defensive Forward - Zachary Dillen

Championships
2015–16 GMHL South Division regular season champions
2016 GMHL South Division playoff champions
2016 GMHL playoff finalists

References

External links
Official website

2015 establishments in Ontario
Ice hockey clubs established in 2015
Ice hockey teams in Ontario